Balıkesir Atatürk Stadium is a multi-purpose stadium in Balıkesir, Turkey.  The stadium holds 15,800 all-seater and was built in 1973 and re-built in 2010. It abides UEFA standards for TFF standards for hosting TFF Second League, TFF First League and also Super Lig games.

The stadium is currently used mostly for football matches, and is the home ground of Balıkesirspor. Turkey national under-21 football team also played games at this stadium. It is also the venue for the celebrations of national days and public concerts.

References

External links
TFF.org Profile
fulbolmerkezi.com Profile
WoW Turkey Profile
worldstadiums.com Profile

Football venues in Turkey
Multi-purpose stadiums in Turkey
Balıkesirspor
Sport in Balıkesir
Buildings and structures in Balıkesir Province
Sports venues completed in 1973
Things named after Mustafa Kemal Atatürk